Miguel Ángel Navarro Quintero (born 11 January 1951) is a Mexican physician and politician affiliated with the National Regeneration Movement (Morena). He served as a senator in the LXIV Legislature of the Mexican Congress from the state of Nayarit, his second term as senator after being elected to the LVIII and LIX Legislatures (2000-2006). He was also a federal deputy in the LVII and LX Legislatures and a two-time gubernatorial candidate in Nayarit. He is the current Governor of Nayarit.

Life
Navarro attended the School of Medicine of the Instituto Politécnico Nacional and graduated in 1976 as a surgeon. That same year, he joined the Institutional Revolutionary Party and the National Confederation of Popular Organizations (CNOP).

As a doctor, Navarro obtained his specialty in obstetrics and gynecology in 1980, rising through the ranks of the ISSSTE hospital system. Between 1981 and 1986, he was the director of the Aquiles Calles Ramírez General Hospital in Tepic, which is part of the ISSSTE system. Additionally, he was a professor at the Universidad Autónoma de Nayarit between 1982 and 1996, heading the Joaquín Herrera School of Nursing. Between 1986 and 1989, he represented the ISSSTE in Tepic, and he entered the state government proper in 1989, first as a director of medical services and finally, between 1996 and 1997, as the state secretariat of health.

First legislative stint
In 1997, Navarro was elected a federal deputy for the first time, beginning a twelve-year uninterrupted run in Congress. In the LVII Legislature, as a federal deputy, he sat on four commissions; additionally, he unsuccessfully ran to be the mayor of Tepic. Three years later, he became a senator, sitting on six commissions during his six-year term.

In March 2005, Navarro competed with Ney González Sánchez to obtain the PRI gubernatorial nomination in Nayarit. After a contested internal election won by González, Navarro claimed fraud and left the PRI. He immediately joined the Party of the Democratic Revolution and ran as its coalition candidate, losing to González Sánchez.

In 2006, Navarro returned to the Chamber of Deputies, where he presided over the Social Security Commission. He ran again, unsuccessfully, for mayor of Tepic in 2008. After his term ended in the Chamber of Deputies, he became a PAN member and was named as the delegate of the IMSS to Chiapas; three years later, he left the party and became an advisor to that state's governor, Manuel Velasco Coello.

Switch to Morena and re-election to the Senate

In July 2016, during a visit by Andrés Manuel López Obrador to Tepic, he named Navarro "promoter of national sovereignty in Nayarit", serving as the beginning of his career in Morena and signaling that he would be the party's gubernatorial candidate in Nayarit in 2017. Navarro Quintero finished a distant third, with 12 percent of the vote. He would win election in 2018, however, when he was one of two candidates on the Juntos Haremos Historia coalition ticket for Senate.

References

1951 births
Living people
Politicians from Tepic, Nayarit
Mexican obstetricians
Members of the Senate of the Republic (Mexico)
Members of the Chamber of Deputies (Mexico)
Institutional Revolutionary Party politicians
Party of the Democratic Revolution politicians
Morena (political party) politicians
21st-century Mexican politicians
20th-century Mexican physicians
Mexican gynecologists
Governors of Nayarit
20th-century Mexican politicians
Instituto Politécnico Nacional alumni
Academic staff of the Autonomous University of Nayarit